A Regular Fellow is a 1919 American silent comedy film, directed by Christy Cabanne. It stars Taylor Holmes, Millicent Fisher, and Edna Phillips Holmes, and was released on April 13, 1919.

Cast list
 Taylor Holmes as Dalion Pemberton
 Millicent Fisher as Virginia Christy
 Edna Phillips Holmes as Lady Westcott
 Frank Leigh as Count Eugenia
 Aileen Manning as Mrs. Horatio Grimm
 Bert Apling as Oiler Tom
 Lillian Langdon as Mrs. Christy
 Bill Durham as gangster
 Leo Willis as gangster

References

External links

 
 
 

Films directed by Christy Cabanne
Triangle Film Corporation films
American silent feature films
Silent American comedy films
American black-and-white films
1919 comedy films
1919 films
1910s American films